Piso may refer to:

Lake Piso, Liberia
Philippine peso, the currency of the Philippines
Piso, Kentucky, an unincorporated community in the United States
PISO algorithm, in computational fluid dynamics
Calpurnius Piso (disambiguation), an ancient Roman family name